Ludwika Paleta (born Ludwika Paleta Paciorek on November 29, 1978 in Kraków, Poland) is a Polish-Mexican actress.

Early life and career 

Paleta was born in Kraków, Poland in 1978.  When her father, the musician Zbigniew Paleta, was offered a job in Mexico, the Paleta family settled permanently. As a child, Ludwika was taken by her sister Dominika Paleta, to an acting audition on a whim. Ludwika impressed the casting directors so much that soon after, she was offered her first television role in Carrusel (1989). Paleta became an instant celebrity with her character. Three years later, in 1992, she returned to the small screen in what she calls her favorite television job yet, El abuelo y yo opposite Gael García Bernal. Roles in Huracán, Amigas y Rivales, and Mujer de Madera soon followed. Her most recent work in television was in the Endemol-Telefe produced Los Exitosos Perez.

Paleta has obtained great fame and popularity in the Latin American country that has been her home since she was merely a child. In an interview, Ludwika Paleta declared that she loves both Mexico and Poland, but that she does not see herself living outside of Mexico in the near-future.

She is fluent in Spanish, Polish and English. In 1998 Paleta married Mexican actor, Plutarco Haza. Their son, Nicolás, was born November 11, 1999. They divorced in 2008. She remarried near Mérida, Yucatán, México on April 20, 2013 with Emiliano Salinas Occelli, son of former Mexican president Carlos Salinas de Gortari and former Mexican first lady Cecilia Occelli.

She joined actor Aarón Díaz as spokespeople for Calvin Klein in Mexico. In 2012, she starred as Estefania Bouvier de Castañón in Abismo de pasion as part of a special participation.

Filmography

Films

Television

Awards and nominations

Premios TVyNovelas

MTV Movie Awards México

Premios Bravo

Diosas de Plata

Premios Tu Mundo

References

External links 
 
 

1978 births
Living people
Mexican child actresses
Mexican telenovela actresses
Mexican television actresses
Mexican film actresses
Mexican stage actresses
Mexican voice actresses
Mexican female models
20th-century Mexican actresses
21st-century Mexican actresses
Polish emigrants to Mexico
Naturalized citizens of Mexico